Virginia Furnace, also known as Muddy Creek Furnace and Josephine Furnace, is a historic water powered blast furnace and national historic district located near Albright, Preston County, West Virginia. The district encompasses three contributing structures and one contributing site.  The furnace was built in 1854, and was a "charcoal" iron furnace used to smelt iron.  It is constructed of cut sandstone, and forms a truncated pyramid measuring approximately 34 feet square in plan and rising about 30 feet.  The district includes the nearby wheel pit, blast machinery, and salamander. The furnace remained in operation until the 1890s, and was the last "charcoal" iron furnace to cease operating in northern West Virginia.  In 1933, the Virginia Furnace was acquired by the Kingwood Chapter of the Daughters of the American Revolution who created a roadside park at the furnace site.

It was listed on the National Register of Historic Places in 1999.

References

Industrial buildings and structures on the National Register of Historic Places in West Virginia
Historic districts in Preston County, West Virginia
Industrial buildings completed in 1854
Buildings and structures in Preston County, West Virginia
Sandstone buildings in the United States
National Register of Historic Places in Preston County, West Virginia
Blast furnaces in the United States
Historic districts on the National Register of Historic Places in West Virginia
1854 establishments in Virginia
Roadside parks